The Greek A2 Basket League, is a professional basketball league in Greece. It is the 2nd-tier level of pro competition, among clubs in the country. It is organized by the Hellenic Basketball Federation (E.O.K.). The league is also known as the Greek A2 Basket Elite League (Ελληνική Α2 Μπάσκετ Ελίτ Λιγκ) for sponsorship reasons.

History
In the 1986–87 season, the current format for Greek professional basketball, consisting of the A1 National Category and the A2 National Category was formed.

Starting with the 2015–16 season, playoffs were added between the 2nd and 5th placed teams for promotion to the 1st tier level Greek Basket League, and a one-game play-out was added to decide relegation to the 3rd tier level Greek B Basket League.

 1986–87 to 2011–12: Hellenic Alpha2 Basket
 2012–13 to present: Greek A2 Basket League

Promotion and relegation
At the end of each season, the following promotion and relegation takes place:
 The top two teams in the A2 are promoted to the Greek Basket League.
 These teams are replaced by the bottom two teams from the Greek Basket League.
 The bottom four teams in the A2 are relegated to the Greek B Basket League.
 These teams are replaced by the top four teams in the Greek B Basket League.

Title holders

 1986–87 Panellinios
 1987–88 Sporting
 1988–89 Peristeri
 1989–90 Papagou
 1990–91 Sporting
 1991–92 Apollon Patras
 1992–93 Papagou
 1993–94 Ampelokipoi
 1994–95 Papagou
 1995–96 Peiraikos
 1996–97 Iraklio
 1997–98 Near East
 1998–99 Dafni
 1999–2000 Makedonikos
 2000–01 KAOD
 2001–02 Makedonikos
 2002–03 Apollon Patras
 2003–04 Panellinios
 2004–05 Kolossos Rodou
 2005–06 Olympias Patras
 2006–07 Sporting
 2007–08 Trikala 2000
 2008–09 Peristeri
 2009–10 Ikaros Kallitheas
 2010–11 KAOD
 2011–12 Panelefsiniakos
 2012–13 Nea Kifissia
 2013–14 AEK
 2014–15 Kavala
 2015–16 Kymis
 2016–17 Panionios
 2017–18 Peristeri
 2018–19 Ionikos Nikaias
 2019–20 Charilaos Trikoupis
 2020–21 Apollon Patras 
 2021–22 ASK Karditsas

Champions and runners-up

Titles by club

Greek A2 League MVP award (official)
(as awarded by the InfoBasket.gr coach's poll)

Eurobasket.com Player of the Year (unofficial)
(as awarded by the website Eurobasket.com)

Top Scorer by points per game

See also
 Greek Basket League
 Greek Cup
 Greek B Basket League
 Greek C Basket League
 HEBA Greek All-Star Game
 HEBA

References

External links
 Official Hellenic Basketball Federation Site 
 Greek A2 Basketball League Stats 
 Greek A2 News, Results, Transfers, Opinions
 Basketblog.gr 
 Greekhoopz.com 
 Greekbball.com 
 A2 Basket League: The Real Heartbeat of Greek Basketball

 
2
Gre
Sports leagues established in 1986
Professional sports leagues in Greece